The market timing hypothesis is a theory of how firms and corporations in the economy decide whether to finance their investment with equity or with debt instruments. It is one of many such corporate finance theories, and is often contrasted with the pecking order theory and the trade-off theory, for example.  The idea that firms pay attention to market conditions in an attempt to time the market is a very old hypothesis.

Baker and Wurgler (2002), claim that market timing is the  first order determinant of a corporation's capital structure use of debt and equity. In other words, firms do not generally care whether they finance with debt or equity, they just choose the form of financing which, at that point in time, seems to be more valued by financial markets. 

Market timing is sometimes classified as part of the behavioral finance literature, because it does not explain why there would be any asset mispricing, or why firms would be better able to tell when there was mis-pricing than financial markets. Rather it just assumes these mis-pricing exists, and describes the behavior of firms under the even stronger assumption that firms can detect this mis-pricing better than markets can. However, any theory with time varying costs and benefits is likely to generate time varying corporate issuing decisions. This is true whether decision makers are behavioral or rational. 

The empirical evidence for this hypothesis is at best, mixed. Baker and Wurgler themselves show that an index of financing that reflects how much of the financing was done during hot equity periods and how much during hot debt periods is a good indicator of firm leverage over long periods subsequently. Alti studied issuance events. He found that the effect of market timing disappears after only two years.

Beyond such academic studies, a complete market timing theory ought to explain why at the same moment in time some firms issue debt while other firms issue equity. As yet nobody has tried to explain this basic problem within a market timing model. The typical version of the market timing hypothesis is thus somewhat incomplete as a matter of theory.

See also 

Corporate finance
Pecking order theory
Capital structure
Trade-off theory

References

Corporate finance
Debt
Finance theories